Pittagoda is a 2016 Indian Telugu-language romantic drama film directed by Anudeep K. V. in his directorial debut and starring newcomer Vishwadev and Punarnavi Bhupalam. The film uses the Karimnagar dialect from Telangana.

Cast 
Vishwadev as Tippu
Punarnavi Bhupalam as Divya

Reception 
Y. Sunitha Chowdhary of The Hindu opined that "The film is excruciatingly slow, the first scene where the kids climb a wall and put up posters is ambitious and interesting, but sadly the interest wanes very soon". Sridivya Palaparthi of The Times of India said that "Pittagoda is a no-frills story and an honest attempt to entertain. If you’re looking for a laid back watch for the weekend, this is it". A critic from 123Telugu said that "On the whole, Pittagoda is small town love story which has its heart in the right place".

References 

2010s Telugu-language films
Films directed by Anudeep K. V.